Tabasaran or Tabassaran may refer to:
Tabasaran language, Caucasus
Tabasaran people, Caucasus
Tabasaran district, Dagestan
Tabasaran Principality, a state in Dagestan that existed from 1642 until the 19th century